Dominick John Lagonegro (born March 6, 1943) is an American prelate of the Roman Catholic Church. He served as an auxiliary bishop of the Archdiocese of New York from 2001 to 2018.

Biography

Early life 
An only child, Dominick Lagonegro was born on March 6, 1943, in White Plains, New York, to Dominick R. and Diamentina (née Morgado) Lagonegro, residents of Harrison, New York and members of St. Anthony of Padua Parish.  His father's family had emigrated from Calabria in southern Italy, and his mother's family from Turquel in central Portugal. Lagonegro studied at Cathedral Preparatory Seminary in Queens,  New York, and later at St. Joseph's Seminary in Yonkers, New York. Lagonegro served as a deacon from 1968 to 1969 before his ordination.

Priesthood 
Lagonegro was ordained to the priesthood for the Archdiocese of New York by Cardinal Terence Cooke at St Theresa's Church in the Pelham Bay section of the Bronx on May 31, 1969. After his ordination, Lagonegro served as parochial vicar at St. Vito's Parish in Mamaroneck, New York. From 1977 to 1980, Lagonegro was assigned as parochial vicar at St. Joseph's Parish in Kingston, New York and taught at John A. Coleman Catholic High School in Hurley, New York.  Lagonegro also served as parochial vicar at Holy Trinity Parish in Poughkeepsie, New York from 1980 to 1989.

Lagonegro was named pastor of Saints Denis and Columba Parish in Hopewell Junction, New York, in 1989, then became the founding pastor of St. Columba Parish after it and Saint Denis Parish split in 1992. He was raised by the Vatican to the rank of monsignor in 1994, and became vicar of Dutchess County in 1997.

Auxiliary Bishop of New York 
On October 30, 2001, Lagonegro was appointed as an auxiliary bishop of the Archdiocese of New York and titular bishop of Modruš by Pope John Paul II. He received his episcopal consecration from Cardinal Edward Egan, with Bishops Henry Mansell and Robert Brucato serving as co-consecrators. He selected as his episcopal motto: Christus Primus, meaning, "Christ First."

In addition to his duties as an auxiliary bishop, Lagonegro serves as vicar of Orange County, episcopal liaison to the Catholic Chaplains Apostolate Committee in New York State, and the United States Conference of Catholic Bishops'(USCCB) liaison to the American Catholic Correctional Chaplains Association. Lagonegro is an opponent of capital punishment, once saying, "In our modern and civilized society, capital punishment is simply unwarranted and inconsistent with the Catholic Church’s vision of the sacred inviolable dignity of the human person, and the need to recognize the possibility of redemption and conversion. We seek a society of justice and peace, not vengeance and violence."On July 2, 2018, Pope Francis accepted Lagonegro's letter of resignation as auxiliary bishop of the Archdiocese of New York after reaching the mandatory retirement age of 75 for bishops.

See also
 

 Catholic Church hierarchy
 Catholic Church in the United States
 Historical list of the Catholic bishops of the United States
 List of Catholic bishops of the United States
 Lists of patriarchs, archbishops, and bishops

References

External links
 Roman Catholic Archdiocese of New York Official Site

Episcopal succession

1943 births
Living people
People from Harrison, New York
21st-century American Roman Catholic titular bishops
Saint Joseph's Seminary (Dunwoodie) alumni